Charles Lamonso Bartlett (June 20, 1851 – April 8, 1898) was an American baker and politician in the U.S. state of Massachusetts. He served as the 5th Mayor of Marlborough, Massachusetts.

Biography
Bartlett was born in Norwich, Vermont and worked as a baker. He was a member of the Common Council, and from 1896 to 1897 was the Mayor of Marlborough, Massachusetts.

References

Further reading
 Bigelow, Ella A. Historical Reminiscences of Marlborough, Massachusetts. Marlborough, MA: Times Company, Printers, Pgs. 358-359 (1910).

External links

	
 

1851 births
1898 deaths
Massachusetts city council members
Massachusetts Republicans
People from Norwich, Vermont
People from Marlborough, Massachusetts
19th-century American politicians